LSI may refer to:

Science and technology 

 Large-scale integration, integrated circuits with tens of thousands of transistors
 Latent semantic indexing, a technique in natural language processing
 LSI-11, an early large-scale integration computer processor that implemented the DEC PDP-11 instruction set
 Langelier saturation index, a measure for water's tendency to form scale
 Linear shift-invariant systems, the discrete equivalent of linear time-invariant systems

Organizations 

 LSI Corporation, a technology company founded in 1981 as LSI Logic Corporation
 Lynch Syndrome International, non-profit organisation supporting those affected by Lynch Syndrome
 Labour and Socialist International, a multinational federation of left wing political parties and trade unions active between 1923 and 1940
 Socialist Movement for Integration (Lëvizja Socialiste për Integrim), a political party in Albania
 Lear Siegler Incorporated, a technology company active from 1961 to 2002
 Lingkaran Survei Indonesia, a survey company in Indonesia

Transportation 

 Lake Superior and Ishpeming Railroad, a railroad service in Michigan, United States
 Sumburgh Airport (IATA airport code) in Shetland, Scotland

Music 

 "LSI (Love Sex Intelligence)", a single by The Shamen
 Long-string instrument, a musical instrument

Other uses 

 Landing ship, infantry, a type of troopship or post World War II a landing craft
 La Salle Institute, a college preparatory school
 Linguistic Survey of India, a survey of the languages of British India directed by G.A. Grierson
 Logical Sensory Introvert, a socionics type